The 2021 GT World Challenge Europe Paul Ricard 1000km was an endurance motor race for the GT World Challenge Europe Endurance Cup, the second race of the 2021 GT World Challenge Europe Endurance Cup, held on 29 May 2021 at the Circuit Paul Ricard in Le Castellet, France.

Classification

Qualifying

 – Hamaguchi contested Qualifying 2 and 3 for car #19.

Race

Standings after the event

Pro Cup standings

Silver Cup standings

Pro-Am Cup standings

 Note: Only the top five positions are included for both sets of standings.

References

External links
Official website
Race replay

|- style="text-align:center"
|width="35%"|Previous race:
|width="30%"|GT World Challenge Europe Endurance Cup2021 season
|width="40%"|Next race:

Paul Ricard
Paul Ricard 1000km
Paul Ricard 1000km